Blue Earth Lake Provincial Park is a provincial park in the Upper Hat Creek area at the south end of the Cornwall Hills, just northwest of Ashcroft, British Columbia, Canada.

See also
Bedard Aspen Provincial Park
Cornwall Hills Provincial Park
Marble Canyon Provincial Park
Oregon Jack Provincial Park

References
BC Parks webpage

External links

Provincial parks of British Columbia
Thompson Country
Canyons and gorges of British Columbia
1996 establishments in British Columbia